BACtrack is a brand of portable breathalyzers owned by KHN Solutions. It is headquartered in San Francisco, California.

Company history 
BACtrack was founded by Keith Nothacker in 2001, during his senior year at the University of Pennsylvania, when he began selling consumer products online.

In 2004, BACtrack received the U.S. Food and Drug Administration (FDA) marketing clearance to sell the AlcoMate CA2000 breathalyzer. BACTrack was among the first companies to sell breathalyzers to the general public for personal use that year.

BACtrack Mobile Smartphone Breathalyzer 
The BACtrack Mobile Smartphone Breathalyzer is a pocket-size breathalyzer that pairs with smartphones and other smart devices via an app and Bluetooth LE, producing an estimate of blood alcohol content (BAC). Results are displayed on the smart device or smartphone screen.
Released on April 23, 2013, the device was the first smartphone-connected breathalyzer available for commercial purchase.

The accuracy of BACtrack Mobile was independently tested and found to be comparable to law enforcement breath alcohol testers. The results of one such study were published in the Journal of Injury Prevention.

Awards 
The BACtrack Mobile Smartphone Breathalyzer won a Popular Science "Best of What’s New Award" as a breakthrough technology in the Health Category for 2013.

BACtrack Mobile and BACtrack Keychain received Car and Driver's highest rating in an industry-wide comparison in March 2014.

BACtrack Consumption Report 
In June, 2014, BACtrack released the BACtrack Consumption Report an aggregation of drinking data and alcohol consumption patterns compiled from users of the BACtrack Mobile Smartphone Breathalyzer.

The data were compiled over the course of a year and represent more than 100,000 alcohol tests taken in over 35 countries, and in all 50 US States. Some of the information in the report includes average blood alcohol content by city and state.

BACtrack View 
BACtrack demonstrated the first smartphone-based remote alcohol monitoring system at the 2018 Consumer Electronics Show.  BACtrack View uses the front facing camera of an iOS or Android phone to record a user blowing to BACtrack Mobile.  The user's BAC result, along with the date, time, and location, are sent in real time to another user for monitoring.

BACtrack Skyn 
On May 19, 2016, the National Institute on Alcohol Abuse and Alcoholism (NIAAA) announced that BACtrack won first prize in the Wearable Alcohol Biosensor Challenge.  The Wearable Alcohol Biosensor Challenge, issued through Challenge.gov in March 2015, called for non-invasive wearable technology that could improve upon existing alcohol biosensor technology used in the criminal justice system. An improved alcohol biosensor could be a valuable resource for the alcohol research community, decreasing reliance on participant self-report in scientific studies.

BACtrack's winning entry, called BACtrack Skyn, is worn on the wrist and measures transdermal alcohol content.  Results are transmitted continuously over Bluetooth to a smartphone app.

References

External links 
Official website

Breathalyzer
American companies established in 2001
Technology companies established in 2001
Companies based in San Francisco
2001 establishments in California